Novoyamurzino (Yañı Yamurźa) is a rural locality (a village) and the administrative centre of Verkhneyanaktayevsky Selsoviet, Baltachevsky District, Bashkortostan, Russia. The population was 297 as of 2010. There are 9 streets.

Geography 
Novoyamurzino is located 12 km south of Starobaltachevo (the district's administrative centre) by road. Verkhneyanaktayevo is the nearest rural locality.

References 

Rural localities in Baltachevsky District